Pulse code cab signaling is a form of cab signaling technology developed in the United States by the Union Switch and Signal corporation for the Pennsylvania Railroad in the 1920s. The 4-aspect system widely adopted by the PRR and its successor railroads has become the dominant railroad cab signaling system in North America with versions of the technology also being adopted in Europe and rapid transit systems.  In its home territory on former PRR successor Conrail owned lines and on railroads operating under the NORAC Rulebook it is known simply as Cab Signaling System or CSS.

History 

In 1922 the Interstate Commerce Commission issued a ruling requiring trains to be equipped with automatic train stop technology if they were to be operated at 80 mph or greater. The Pennsylvania Railroad decided to use this as an opportunity to implement a signaling technology that could improve both safety and operational efficiency by displaying a signal continuously in the locomotive cab. The task was assigned to Union Switch and Signal corporation, the PRR's preferred signal supplier.

The first test installation between Sunbury and Lewistown, PA in 1923 used the tracks as an inductive loop coupled to the locomotive's receiver. The system had two 60 Hz signals. The break-sensing “track” signal was fed down one rail towards the oncoming train and crossed through its wheels, returning in the other rail. The pickup just ahead of the wheels would sum the approaching current from one side with the returning current on the other. The externally returned ”loop” signal was fed into and out of the mid tap of a resistor across each end of the track circuit. The pickup would sum the approaching current on each side as it carried on past to the far end of the track. This signal was shifted 90 degrees from the other. The signals were applied one or both continuously to give Approach or Clear aspects while no signal was a Restricting aspect. The test installation eliminated wayside block signals, and trains relied solely on cab signals.

For its next installation, on the Northern Central line between Baltimore, MD and Harrisburg, PA in 1926 (1927?), the PRR tested another variation of cab signals which dropped the loop signal and switched to 100 Hz for the track signal. The pivotal change was that now it would come on above Restricting merely as a carrier and 1.25 to 3 Hz on-off pulsing of it would be used as a code to convey the aspects. The presence of the carrier alone was not meaningful, no pulsing would still mean a Restricting aspect. This new system allowed four signal aspects: Restricting; Approach; Approach (next signal at) Medium (speed); and Clear. Initially the cab signaling system only acted as a form of automatic train stop where the engineer would have to acknowledge any drop in the cab signal to a more restrictive aspect to prevent the brakes from automatically applying. Later, passenger engines were upgraded with speed control which enforced the rulebook speed associated with each cab signal (Clear = No Restriction, Approach Medium = 45 mph, Approach = 30 mph, Restricting = 20 mph).

Over time the PRR installed cab signals over much of its eastern system from Pittsburgh to Philadelphia, New York to Washington. This system was then inherited by Conrail and Amtrak and various commuter agencies running on former PRR territory such as SEPTA and New Jersey Transit. Because all trains running in cab signal territory had to be equipped with cab signals, most locomotives of the aforementioned roads were equipped with cab signal equipment. Due to the effect of interoperability lock in, the 4-aspect PRR cab signal system has become a de facto standard and almost all new cab signaling installations have been of this type or a compatible type.

Technical overview

Basic operation

Pulse code cab signals work by sending metered pulses along an existing AC track circuit operating at a chosen carrier frequency.  The pulses are detected via induction by a sensor hanging a few inches above the rail before the leading set of wheels. The codes are measured in pulses per minute and for the 4-aspect PRR system are set at 180 ppm for Clear, 120 ppm for Approach Medium, 75 ppm for Approach and 0 for Restricting. The pulse rates are chosen to avoid any one rate being a multiple of another leading to reflected harmonics causing false indications.

The system is failsafe in that the lack of code would display a Restricting signal. The codes would be transmitted to the train from the block limit in front of it. This way if the rail was broken or another train entered the block, any codes would not reach the approaching train and the cab signal would again display Restricting. Trains with an insufficient number of axles will not short out all of the cab signal current so that following trains might receive an incorrect aspect. Trains of this type must be given absolute block protection to the rear.

Where DC and 25 Hz AC electrification co-exist, the standard 100 Hz frequency is changed to 91⅔ Hz (next available M-G set frequency). This avoids even harmonics created by the return rail's DC traction current offsetting the AC return sine wave in the same rail.

Enhancements for higher speeds 

70 years after pulse code cab signals had been introduced, the 4 speed design was found to be insufficient for speeds not envisioned when the system was designed.  The two most pressing problems were the use of high speed turnouts, which allowed trains to take a diverging route faster than the normal 30 or 45 mph covered by the existing cab signals.  The introduction of Amtrak's Acela Express service with its 135 mph to 150 mph maximum speeds would also exceed the capabilities of the legacy signaling system and its 125 mph design speed.

To address the problem and avoid a complete rebuild of the signaling system, impair lower speed service, break backwards compatibility with existing cab signals or place too high a reliance on the human operator, an overlay pulse code system was devised for use on Amtrak's Northeast Corridor.  By operating with a different carrier frequency of 250 Hz, additional pulse codes could be sent to the train without interfering with legacy 100 Hz codes.  By carefully designing the overlay codes, backwards compatibility could be maintained so that any train unable to detect the new codes would never receive a signal more favorable than had it would otherwise detect.  In addition to the use of 250 Hz codes, a 5th, 270ppm code was incorporated from rapid transit and Long Island Rail Road use.

The mapping of codes to speeds is as follows:

Trains with the ability to get the 250 Hz codes get upgraded speeds on track sections with speeds greater than 125 mph and on 80 mph high speed turnouts.  Trains without simply travel at the slower speeds.  The 270ppm code does break backwards compatibility with the 4-code system, but is only in use around New York Penn Station as part of a high density signaling upgrade.  The 270ppm code and 60 mph speed were chosen to be compatible with the cab signals installed on the Long Island Rail Road trains that also use Penn Station.

Cab display unit 

Cab signals are presented to the locomotive by means of a cab signal display unit. The earliest CDUs consisted of miniature signals of the type visible along the track, back lit by light bulbs. These could be found in both color light and position light varieties depending on the railroad's native signaling system. Modern CDUs on passenger trains are often integrated with the speedometer, as cab signals now serve a speed control function. On trains equipped with automatic train control functionality failure to properly acknowledge a restrictive cab signal change results in a 'penalty brake application', as does failure to observe the cab signal speed limit.

Usage

Current lines using the 100 Hz 4-aspect PRR cab signal system 

 Amtrak Northeast Corridor
 Amtrak Dorchester Branch
 Amtrak Main Line—Mill River to Springfield
 Amtrak Main Line—New Haven to Boston
 Amtrak Main Line—New York to Hoffmans
 Amtrak Main Line—New York to New Rochelle
 Amtrak Main Line—New York to Philadelphia
 Amtrak Main Line—Philadelphia to Harrisburg
 Amtrak Main Line—Philadelphia to Washington
 Amtrak Middleboro Main Line
 Conrail Lehigh Line
 CSX Berkshire Subdivision (no waysides)
CSX Boston Subdivision (no waysides)
CSX Landover Subdivision
 CSX RF&P Subdivision (formerly using RF&P CSS system at 60 Hz)
NJT All lines (except Princeton Branch)
 MBTA All South Side Lines
 Metro-North Hudson Line (no waysides)
 Metro-North Harlem Line (no waysides)
 Metro-North New Haven Line (no waysides)
 Metro-North New Canaan Branch (no waysides)
 Metro-North Danbury Branch (no waysides)
 Metro-North Southern Tier Line (no waysides)
 Norfolk Southern Pittsburgh Line (no waysides)
 Norfolk Southern Port Road Line
 Norfolk Southern Conemaugh Line (no waysides)
 Norfolk Southern Morrisville Line (no waysides)
 Norfolk Southern Fort Wayne Line (Conway Yard to Alliance, Ohio, no waysides)
 Norfolk Southern Cleveland Line (Alliance, Ohio to Cleveland, Ohio, no waysides)
 SEPTA Main Line (Center City to Doylestown; no waysides north of Wayne Junction)
 SEPTA Airport Line
 SEPTA Chestnut Hill East Line (no waysides)
 SEPTA Chestnut Hill West Line (no waysides)
 SEPTA Cynwyd Line (no waysides)
 SEPTA Fox Chase Line (no waysides)
 SEPTA Manayunk/Norristown Line (no waysides)
 SEPTA Media/Wawa Line
 SEPTA Warminster Line (no waysides)
 SEPTA West Trenton Line (no waysides)

Related North American pulse code systems 

 Long Island Rail Road Automatic Speed Control: The LIRR was a PRR subsidiary and adopted a similar system. The LIRR used standard PRR cab signals until bought by the Metropolitan Transportation Authority in 1968, when it was modified slightly into ASC systems used to this day.  ASC employs two additional codes, 270 and 420 ppm and replaces the in-cab signal display with an in-cab speed display. The additional codes are used to display speeds of 50/60 and 60/70 mph, which are used to slow trains for curves, higher speed turnouts and short signal blocks.
 Chicago, Burlington and Quincy Automatic Cab Signaling: The CB&Q commuter line to Aurora, Illinois used the same technology as the Pennsylvania, just with different rules and wayside indications to conform to their partly route-based signaling system.  It remains in service to the present day.
 Union Pacific Automatic Cab Signaling: The Union Pacific has implemented the PRR type technology on much of its main line between Chicago and Wyoming, as well as several other lines on its system in recent years.  As with the CB&Q cab signals, the system works under the same principles as the PRR system, but uses different rules with partly route-based wayside signals and a 60 Hz carrier, which makes it somewhat incompatible with the 100 Hz systems.
 Metra Rock Island Automatic Train Control: Another PRR based cab signal system remnant from the Rock Island. The system is in service on the Metra Rock Island District between Blue Island and Joliet.
 Rapid Transit Lines: Various rapid transit lines built or re-signaled in or before the 1990s make use of the pulse-code cab signal technology for both manual or automatic train operation schemes. Rapid transit systems are typically failsafe with a 0 code mandating a complete stop. Also, the complete range of pulse codes are used to provide the maximum granularity in speed control. Some examples include the PATCO Speedline in Philadelphia, the SEPTA Route 100, the Baltimore Metro and the Miami-Dade Metrorail. Pulse-code technology on rapid transit lines has generally been supplanted by Audio-Frequency cab signals.
 MTA Staten Island Railway Automatic Speed Control: A hybrid of the PRR/LIRR systems and Rapid Transit power-frequency cab code. The ATC applies service braking in response to overspeed conditions. 75-120-180-270 are used as speed commands. Zero code is used for stop rather than restricting, which is 50PPM. 420 is used as a latch-out. Dispatchers may authorize trains stopped by a zero-code to close in on certain interlocking signals by manually activating a 50 ppm close-in code.

European pulse code systems 

 RS4 Codici is the legacy cab signaling system used in Italy. The system makes use of 0, 75, 120, 180 and 270 ppm codes using a 50 Hz current.
 ALSN (Continuous Automatic Train Signalling) is a legacy system used in the ex-Soviet states (Russian Federation, Ukraine, Belarus, Latvia, Lithuania, Estonia). The system makes use of pulses at 0, 25, 50 and 75 ppm. Extensions in the ALS-ARS automatic train operation system encode with 75, 125, 175, 225, 275 ppm.  Some of the code rates use non-uniform pulse durations.
 Continuous Automatic Warning System is the cab signaling systems in Ireland.  The system makes use of 0, 50, 120 and 180 ppm codes using a 50 Hz carrier current. Additional codes are used on some rapid transit lines.
 Automatische treinbeïnvloeding is the Dutch cab signaling system. It makes use of 0, 75, 96, 120, 180 and 220 ppm codes using a 75 Hz carrier, supplemented by an inductive train stop system for speeds under 25 mph.
 London Underground Victoria line used US&S supplied pulse code cab signals to implement its Automatic train operation system until 2012 when it was replaced by CBTC.  Codes used were 420, 270, 180 and 120 ppm.

References 

Train protection systems